Carrigans railway station served Carrigans, County Donegal, in Ulster, Ireland.

The Londonderry and Enniskillen Railway opened the station on 19 April 1847. It was taken over by the Great Northern Railway (Ireland) in 1883, and became part of the Ulster Transport Authority on dissolution of the GNR in 1958. The station was closed, as was the entire Derry = Strabane - Omagh - Dungannon - Portadown line in 1965.

It closed on 15 February 1965.

Routes

References

Disused railway stations in County Donegal
Railway stations opened in 1847
Railway stations closed in 1965
1847 establishments in Ireland
Railway stations in the Republic of Ireland opened in 1847
Railway stations in Northern Ireland opened in the 19th century